The Church of the Holy Family is a Roman Catholic church located in Dunblane, Scotland.

History
From 1883 the local Catholic community met in a coach house in the grounds.  The priest would travel from the Catholic church at Doune for mass each Sunday. The church was planned in the early 1930s and the building completed and officially opened on 27 December 1934. It was designed by the Scottish architect Reginald Fairlie. It is Romanesque in style with an Arts and Craft style roof.

Memorial Window
The Dunblane Memorial Window is a set of three stained glass windows that were erected in memory of those who were killed or injured in the Dunblane massacre at Dunblane Primary School on 13 March 1996.

References

Roman Catholic churches in Scotland
Roman Catholic churches completed in 1934
1883 establishments in Scotland
20th-century Roman Catholic church buildings in the United Kingdom
Churches in Stirling (council area)
Church of the Holy Family